The 2002–2003 Liga Alef season saw Hapoel Herzliya (champions of the North Division) and Hapoel Tira (champions of the South Division) winning the title and promotion to 2003–04. During the summer, Beitar Avraham Be'er Sheva folded, and Hapoel Marmorek was promoted to 2003–04 as well.

At the bottom, Hapoel Hadera, Hapoel Tayibe (from North division) were all automatically relegated to Liga Bet, whilst Beitar Kiryat Gat and A.S. Ramat Eliyahu (from South division) were reprieved from relegation, after Beitar Avraham Be'er Sheva and Hapoel Dimona folded.

North Division

South Division

References
Liga Alef 02/03, walla.co.il

Liga Alef seasons
4
Israel